Marissa Stander Van der Merwe (born 30 August 1978 in Pretoria) is a retired South African professional road cyclist. She has awarded two South African championship titles each in both road race and time trial, and later represented her nation South Africa at the 2008 Summer Olympics. Marissa also raced for the nation's  team before her official retirement in 2011.

Marissa made her official debut at the 2007 All-Africa Games in Algiers, Algeria, where she won the silver medal in the women's road race with a final time of 2:00:54, finishing behind her teammate Yolandi du Toit.

At the 2008 Summer Olympics in Beijing, Marissa  qualified for the South African squad in the women's road race by receiving one of the nation's two available berths from the UCI World Cup. She successfully completed a grueling race with a thirty-fourth-place effort in 3:33:17, surpassing Great Britain's Sharon Laws and the Netherlands' Mirjam Melchers by a few inches. On that same year, Marissa earned the women's time trial title in her first and only attempt at the South African Championships in East London.

Career highlights
2006
 2nd South African Championships (Road), Port Elizabeth (RSA)
2007
 2nd All-Africa Games, Algiers (ALG)
 2nd South African Championships (Road), South Africa
 3rd South African Championships (ITT), South Africa
2008
 1st  South African Championships (ITT), East London (RSA)
 34th Olympic Games (Road), Beijing (CHN)
2009
 3rd South African Championships (ITT), Oudtshoorn (RSA)
2011
 1st  South African Championships (Road), Port Elizabeth (RSA)

References

External links
NBC Olympics Profile

 www.procyclingstats.com/rider/Marissa_Stander
 www.cyclingarchives.com/coureurfiche.php?coureurid=76203

1978 births
Living people
Afrikaner people
South African female cyclists
Cyclists at the 2008 Summer Olympics
Olympic cyclists of South Africa
Sportspeople from Pretoria
African Games silver medalists for South Africa
African Games medalists in cycling
Competitors at the 2007 All-Africa Games
21st-century South African women